Expansión is a Spanish-language news magazine targeted to business markets in Mexico and Latin America created in 1969 and redesigned in 1999. While most business media in Mexico focus on macroeconomic and political aspects, Expansión is set apart by its coverage of the people and ideas that drive the private sector in Mexico.

Expansión is the flagship publication of Grupo Expansión (GEx), founded in 1966. In 2005, GEx was bought by Time Inc. In 2007, Expansión and CNN jointly launched a website specializing in business, economic, and financial aspects in Mexico and Latin America. The site was originally launched as CNNExpansion.com as an adaptation modeled on CNNmoney.com for the Latin American market.

Expansión includes more advertising pages than any other magazine in Mexico for more than 10 years only in the last 3 years has it been surpassed by its sister publication: Who magazine. With 51,000 copies aimed at an executive segment (93% senior management), Expansión has been the authority on business in Mexico for more than 50 years and has almost twice the circulation of its closest competitor.

References

External links 
 Expansión
 Grupo Expansión
 Time Inc.

1969 establishments in Mexico
Business magazines
Magazines published in Mexico
Magazines established in 1969
Mass media in Mexico City
News magazines published in South America
Spanish-language magazines